The Battle of Messinopolis took place on 4 September 1207, at Mosynopolis near the town of Komotini in contemporary Greece, and was fought between the Bulgarians and the Latin Empire. It resulted in a Bulgarian victory.

While the armies of the Bulgarian emperor Kaloyan were besieging Odrin, Boniface of Montferrat, king of Thessalonica, launched attacks towards Bulgaria from Serres. His cavalry reached Messinopolis at 5 days raid to the east of Serres but in the mountainous terrain around the town his army was attacked by a larger force composed mainly of local Bulgarians. The battle began in the Latin rear guard and Boniface managed to repulse the Bulgarians, but while he was chasing them he was killed by an arrow, and soon the crusaders were defeated. His head was sent to Kaloyan, who immediately organized a campaign against Boniface's capital of Thessalonica. However, Kaloyan was murdered by conspirators during the siege, and the grieved Bulgarians raised the siege.

1207 in Europe
Battles involving the Second Bulgarian Empire
Battles involving the Latin Empire
13th century in Bulgaria
Bulgarian–Latin Wars
Conflicts in 1207
Medieval Thrace
Komotini